The 1973 British Hard Court Championships, also known by its sponsored name Rothmans British Hard Court Championships, was a combined men's and women's tennis tournament played on outdoor clay courts at The West Hants Club in Bournemouth, England. The event was part of the Grand Prix circuit and the event was categorized as B class for the men and C class for the women. The tournament was held from 7 May through 12 May 1973. Adriano Panatta and Virginia Wade won the singles titles.

Finals

Men's singles
 Adriano Panatta defeated  Ilie Năstase 6–8, 7–5, 6–3, 8-6

Women's singles
 Virginia Wade defeated  Evonne Goolagong 6–4, 6–4

Men's doubles
 Juan Gisbert /  Ilie Năstase defeated  Adriano Panatta /  Ion Ţiriac 6–4, 8–6

Women's doubles
 Patricia Coleman /  Wendy Turnbull defeated  Evonne Goolagong /  Janet Young 7–5, 7–5

Mixed doubles
 Virginia Wade /  Frew McMillan defeated  Bernard Mitton /  Ilana Kloss 6–2, 6–3

References

External links
 ITF tournament edition details

British Hard Court Championships
British Hard Court Championships
Clay court tennis tournaments
British Hard Court Championships
British Hard Court Championships